Still Fragments is a live album by Djen Ajakan Shean and Vidna Obmana, released in 1994 through N D.

Track listing

Personnel 
Musicians
Vidna Obmana – tape, didgeridoo, arrangement, photography, rainstick and percussion on Part Two
Djen Ajakan Shean – drum machine, flute, percussion and arrangement on Part One
Production and additional personnel
Fil Van der Auwera – engineering
Ralph Kessler – engineering
Michael Northum – design
Daniel Plunkett – design

References 

1994 live albums
Vidna Obmana albums